Attenella is a genus of spiny crawler mayflies in the family Ephemerellidae. There are at least four described species in Attenella.

Species
These four species belong to the genus Attenella:
 Attenella attenuata (McDunnough, 1925)
 Attenella delantala (Mayo, 1952)
 Attenella margarita (Needham, 1927)
 Attenella soquele (Day, 1954)

References

Further reading

 
 

Mayfly genera
Articles created by Qbugbot